Henri Freycinet Harbour, also known as Freycinet Estuary, is one of the inner gulfs of Shark Bay, Western Australia, a World Heritage Site that lies to the west of the Peron Peninsula.

It has a significantly larger number of islands than Hamelin Pool, and has a number of smaller peninsulas known as "prongs" on its northern area. It has also been identified as a critical dugong habitat area.

It is situated within the Shark Bay Marine Park.

The estuary has been dredged as part of works related to the Shark Bay Salt Joint Venture.

Islands
 Baudin Island
 Charles Island
 Freycinet Island
 Lefebre Island
 Salutation Island

References

Shark Bay